The Croatian Boxing Federation is the governing body of amateur boxing in Croatia. It was established in 1921.

It is a member organization of the Croatian Olympic Committee.

References

External links
  

National members of the European Boxing Confederation
Boxing in Croatia
Boxing Federation
1921 establishments in Croatia
Amateur boxing organizations